Jozef Leo Armand Langenus (23 December 1898 – 29 May 1987) was a Belgian middle-distance runner. He competed in the men's 3000 metres steeplechase at the 1928 Summer Olympics held in Amsterdam, Netherlands.

References

1898 births
1987 deaths
Athletes (track and field) at the 1928 Summer Olympics
Belgian male middle-distance runners
Belgian male steeplechase runners
Olympic athletes of Belgium
Place of birth missing